Parry is a hamlet in the Canadian province of Saskatchewan.

A Reliance Elevator opened in Parry in 1925. In 1948, the Saskatchewan Wheat Pool purchased the elevator and took over its operation.

Demographics 

References

Caledonia No. 99, Saskatchewan
Designated places in Saskatchewan
Organized hamlets in Saskatchewan
Division No. 2, Saskatchewan